Starlink Aviation is a Canadian charter airline and a fixed-base operator. It is based at the Montréal–Trudeau International Airport in Dorval, Quebec.

Starlink acquired Canada's first Pilatus PC-24.

History
Starlink Aviation was founded as a fixed-base operator at then Dorval International Airport  in 1981 as Avionair and was renamed in 1999. The company acquired a fleet of turboprop and jet aircraft, and began leasing them as private aircraft  to clients.

In 2003, the company also began a scheduled "corporate shuttle" service from Montreal with its BAe Jetstream 31 aircraft to the cities of Alma and La Baie (Bagotville) in Quebec, Canada. These services were later discontinued in 2009 and 2013 respectively. In April 2008, Starlink announced a partnership with the American fractional jet company Flight Options to form "Flight Options Canada," expanding the charter networks of both companies.

In January 2009, service by Starlink Airlines between Yarmouth, Halifax, Nova Scotia and Portland, Maine was announced, with two flights daily, beginning February 4 of the same year. On December 1, 2009, service ceased due to depletion of the Air Service Fund.

Aircraft
As of October 2022, Starlink operates the following 18 aircraft registered with Transport Canada:

Former aircraft

Starlink Aviation has previously operated the following aircraft:
Beechcraft King Air
Beechcraft Super King Air 200
Beechcraft 1900
Boeing 737
British Aerospace Jetstream
Cessna 208 Caravan
Cessna Citation I
Dassault Falcon 900
Embraer EMB 120 Brasilia
Embraer EMB 500
Hawker Siddeley HS-125
Learjet 60
Piaggio P.180 Avanti
Swearingen Merlin

References

External links

Starlink Aviation

Regional airlines of Quebec